β-Hexachlorocyclohexane (β-HCH) is an organochloride which is one of the isomers of hexachlorocyclohexane (HCH).  It is a byproduct of the production of the insecticide lindane (γ-HCH).  It is typically constitutes 5–14% of technical-grade lindane,  though it has not been produced or used in the United States since 1985. As of 2009, the Stockholm Convention on Persistent Organic Pollutants classified α-hexachlorocyclohexane and β-HCH as persistent organic pollutants (POPs), due to the chemical's ability to persist in the environment, bioaccumulative, biomagnifying, and long-range transport capacity.

This pesticide was widely used during the 1960s and 1970s, particularly on cotton plants. Although banned as a pesticide more than 30 years ago, traces of beta-HCH can still be found in water and soil. Animal studies show that organochlorine pesticides, including beta-HCH, are neurotoxic, cause oxidative stress, and damage the brain's dopaminergic system. Human studies show that exposure to beta-HCH is linked to Parkinson's and Alzheimer's disease. β-HCH was present in elevated levels in some patients as recently as 2009.
It was manufactured by exhausting chlorination of benzene and for this reason was called erroneously β-BHC.  This synonym still persists.

In March 2005, the Italian National Monitoring System on Chemical Residuals in Food of Animal Origin detected levels of the pesticide β-HCH that were 20 times higher than the legal limit of 0.003 mg/kg in bulk milk from a dairy farm in the Sacco River valley. β-HCH, a lindane isomer and possible human carcinogen, was subsequently found in milk from several neighboring farms. A study was therefore undertaken to evaluate the extent and risk factors for contamination.

See also
α-Hexachlorocyclohexane

References

External links
beta-Hexachlorocyclohexane (beta-HCH) - Integrated Risk Information System – US EPA
Cyclohexane, 1,2,3,4,5,6-hexachloro-, (1α,2β,3α,4β,5α,6β)- – NIST

Organochlorides
Persistent organic pollutants under the Stockholm Convention
Persistent organic pollutants under the Convention on Long-Range Transboundary Air Pollution